Venkata Narayana Padmanabhan is a computer scientist and principal researcher at Microsoft Research India. He is known for his research in networked and mobile systems. He is an elected fellow of the Indian National Academy of Engineering, Institute of Electrical and Electronics Engineers and the Association for Computing Machinery. The Council of Scientific and Industrial Research, the apex agency of the Government of India for scientific research, awarded him the Shanti Swarup Bhatnagar Prize for Science and Technology, one of the highest Indian science awards for his contributions to Engineering Sciences in 2016.

Biography

Padmanabhan did his graduate studies in computer Science and Engineering at the Indian Institute of Technology, Delhi and after earning a BTech in 1993, he pursued his higher studies at University of California, Berkeley from where he secured a master's degree (MS) under the guidance of Domenico Ferrari in 1995 and a PhD, advised by Randy Katz in 1998. With Katz, he worked on Web Data Transport and his thesis, Addressing the Challenges of Web Data Transport. Starting his career at the Redmond station of Microsoft, he served there for over 8 years before returning to India as the principal researcher at Microsoft India and heads the Mobility, Networks and Systems group, which he founded in 2007.

Padmanabhan has done extensive research on Indoor positioning systems, smartphone-based sensing, and mobile communication and his work has resulted in the development of technologies which is being used by Microsoft in their products. He has documented his researches by way of several articles; He has been involved with the organization of ACM SIGCOMM conferences and served as the general co-chair of the 2010 edition in New Delhi and as the program co-chair of the 2012 edition. He sits in the editorial boards of journals such as ACM SIGCOMM Computer Communication Review, IEEE/ACM Transactions on Networking, and IEEE Transactions on Mobile Computing. and chairs the Award Committee for ACM SIGMOBILE Test-of-Time Paper Award 2017.

Awards and honors
The Association for Computing Machinery elected Padmanabhan as a Distinguished Scientist in 2009 and as a Fellow in 2016. He was elected a Fellow of Institute of Electrical and Electronics Engineers in 2012 and of the Indian National Academy of Engineering in 2014. The Council of Scientific and Industrial Research awarded him the Shanti Swarup Bhatnagar Prize, one of the highest Indian science awards in 2016.

Selected bibliography

Books

Articles

See also

Nericell
BitTorrent
Mesh networking
Location-based service

Notes

References

External links

Further reading

20th-century births
Living people
Recipients of the Shanti Swarup Bhatnagar Award in Engineering Science
Indian scientific authors
IIT Delhi alumni
University of California, Berkeley alumni
Microsoft Research people
Indian electronics engineers
Indian computer scientists
Fellow Members of the IEEE
Fellows of the Association for Computing Machinery
Fellows of the Indian National Academy of Engineering
Scientists from Bangalore
Engineers from Karnataka
Year of birth missing (living people)